Bayan is a rural locality (a selo) in Dzhidinsky District, Republic of Buryatia, Russia. The population was 40 as of 2010. There are 2 streets.

Geography 
Bayan is located 12 km southwest of Petropavlovka (the district's administrative centre) by road. Bulyk is the nearest rural locality.

References 

Rural localities in Dzhidinsky District